Seeds of Death may refer to the following

Film and television
 Have Mercy on Us All aka Seeds of Death, a 2007 film directed by Régis Wargnier
 The Seeds of Death a serial from the Dr. Who series

Books
 The Seeds of Death, a book by Terrance Dicks based on the Dr. Who series # 112